Zhou Jiamin (born 9 February 1990) is a Chinese Paralympic archer.

In the 2016 Summer Paralympics, her debut games, Zhou won two gold medals.

References

Paralympic archers of China
Archers at the 2016 Summer Paralympics
Paralympic gold medalists for China
Living people
Chinese female archers
1990 births
Medalists at the 2016 Summer Paralympics
Paralympic medalists in archery
21st-century Chinese women